Omar Ortega Álvarez (born 14 September 1970) is a Mexican politician affiliated with the Party of the Democratic Revolution. As of 2014 he served as Deputy of the LIX Legislature of the Mexican Congress as a plurinominal representative.

References

1970 births
Living people
Politicians from Jalisco
Members of the Chamber of Deputies (Mexico)
Party of the Democratic Revolution politicians
21st-century Mexican politicians
Deputies of the LIX Legislature of Mexico
People from Ciudad Guzmán, Jalisco